UFC Fight Night: Hunt vs. Bigfoot (also known as UFC Fight Night 33) was a mixed martial arts event held on 6 December 2013, at the Brisbane Entertainment Centre in Brisbane, Queensland, Australia. The event was broadcast live on Fox Sports 1.

Background
The event was the first the UFC has hosted in Brisbane. Overall, it was the fifth UFC event to be held in Australia.

The card was headlined by a heavyweight bout between Mark Hunt and Antônio Silva. The main event ended in a rare majority draw decision; one judge scoring the fight 48–47 for Mark Hunt, while the other two saw it a 47–47 draw.  Post-fight, UFC President Dana White said that the bout had earned Fight of the Night honors.

Subsequently, Silva failed a post-fight test for elevated testosterone (he had been undergoing UFC-approved testosterone replacement therapy). Silva was suspended for nine months, retroactive to the date of the fight. Due to Silva's positive test, Hunt was given the total of $100,000 from the Fight of the Night bonus award. For Hunt the bout result remains a "draw" on his official record, while in Silva's case it was overturned to a no-contest.

Brian Melancon was expected to face Robert Whittaker at the event. However, Melancon pulled out of the bout and subsequently announced his retirement due to renal stress. As a result, Whittaker was removed from the card as well.

Mitch Gagnon was expected to face Alex Caceres at the event. However, the bout was cancelled during the week leading up to the event due to an alleged visa issue for Gagnon, restricting his entry to Australia.

Results

Bonus awards
The following fighters were awarded $50,000 bonuses. As Silva failed his post-fight drug test, his bonus share was taken back by the UFC and awarded to Hunt who received the full $170,000.

 Fight of The Night: Mark Hunt vs. Antonio Silva
 Knockout of The Night: Maurício Rua
 Submission of the Night:  Not awarded as no matches ended by submission.

See also

2013 in UFC
List of UFC events
Mixed martial arts in Australia

References

UFC Fight Night
2013 in mixed martial arts
Mixed martial arts in Australia
Sport in Brisbane
2013 in Australian sport